Nhlanhlakayise Moses Khubisa is a South African politician who served as a Member of the National Assembly between May 2014 and May 2019. He was a member of the National Freedom Party and served as the party's secretary-general. Khubisa joined the African National Congress right before the 2019 elections.

Political career
Khubisa was a member of the National Freedom Party and the party's secretary-general. After the 2014 general election, he was sworn in as a Member of the National Assembly of South Africa for the party. He was the chief whip of the party's caucus. During his time in parliament, he was a member of the following committees: Cooperative Governance and Traditional Affairs, Higher Education and Training, and Science and Technology.

On 4 May 2019, Khubisa was welcomed into the African National Congress by party president Cyril Ramaphosa. He left parliament on 7 May, as the parliamentary term expired.

References

Living people
Year of birth missing (living people)
Zulu people
People from KwaZulu-Natal
African National Congress politicians
Members of the National Assembly of South Africa
National Freedom Party politicians